PLG may refer to:
 P. League+, Taiwanese basketball league
 Parti Libéral Genevois (Liberal Party of Geneva)
 Pierre-Luc Gagnon, a skateboarder
 Plasminogen
 Polegate railway station, a railway station in Sussex, England
 Polynesian Leaders Group
 Product-led growth
 Progressive Librarians Guild
 Prospect Lefferts Gardens, Brooklyn, New York, US